The United States has friendly relations with the Republic of Maldives since the nation's independence from the United Kingdom in 1966. The U.S. ambassador and some Embassy staff in Sri Lanka are accredited to the Maldives and make periodic visits. On other hand, Maldives is represented in U.S. through its Permanent Mission to the UN at New York City (see also Headquarters of the United Nations). 

The United States supports Maldivian independence and territorial integrity, and publicly endorsed India's timely intervention on behalf of the Maldivian Government during the November 1988 coup attempt. U.S. Naval vessels have regularly called at Malé in recent years. The Maldives extended strong support to U.S. efforts to combat terrorism and terrorist financing in 2001–2002.

History

U.S. contributions to economic development in the Maldives have been made principally through international organization programs. Following the December 2004 tsunami, the U.S. and Maldives signed a bilateral assistance agreement for $8.6 million in reconstruction assistance. This assistance will help in the rebuilding of harbors, sewage systems, and electrical generation facilities and in the development of aid absorption capacity in the Ministry of Finance.  The United States has directly funded training in airport management and narcotics interdiction and provided desktop computers for Maldivian customs, immigration, and drug-control efforts in recent years. The United States also trains a small number of Maldivian military personnel annually. About 10 U.S. citizens are resident in the Maldives; some 5,000 Americans visit the Maldives annually.

Alaina B. Teplitz is the current U.S. Ambassador to the Maldives. The relevant U.S. Embassy is in Colombo, Sri Lanka. Secretary of State Mike Pompeo announced during a trip to the Maldives that the United States would be opening an embassy in Malé. The opening of an embassy will combat growing Chinese influence in a country that stretches through crucial shipping lanes.

Defense 

The United States and Maldives have been deepening their military and political ties since the election of Ibrahim Mohamed Solih as President of the Maldives. In September 2020 the United States and Maldives signed a defense agreement with each other in Philadelphia. The agreement had been in the works since 2013, but had previously been blocked by the Indian government's opposition to the agreement. Indian officials have since welcomed the agreement saying that Maldives is part of the Indo-Pacific. The United States is one of several countries that provides military aid to broaden the capacity of the Maldivian Armed Forces.

Aid 
The United States donated 60 ventilators to Maldives during the COVID-19 pandemic. The United States also gave a grant of $2 million for economic support during the pandemic and $150,000 worth of personal protective equipment.

References

External links
History of Maldives - U.S. relations

Embassy of the Republic of Maldives to the U.S.
U.S. Virtual Presence Post-Maldives

 
Bilateral relations of the United States
United States